The Sarajevo Irish Festival is an annual festival held in Sarajevo, Bosnia and Herzegovina that celebrates Irish culture. The festival was established in 2015 and is held for three days around and including St. Patrick's Day. It was founded by Irish expatriates in Bosnia and Herzegovina in cooperation with the Bosnian Ministry of Foreign Affairs and Culture Ireland. The festival hosts Irish theatre companies, screens Irish films and organizes concerts of Irish folk musicians.  The festival has hosted numerous Irish artists, filmmakers, theatre directors and musicians such as Conor Horgan, Ailis Ni Riain, Dermot Dunne, Mick Moloney, Chloë Agnew and others.

References

External links
 Official website

Festivals established in 2015
March events
Tourist attractions in Sarajevo
Annual events in Bosnia and Herzegovina
Cultural festivals in Bosnia and Herzegovina
Irish culture
Festivals in Sarajevo
2015 establishments in Bosnia and Herzegovina